is a Japanese visual novel by Rosebleu. It was first released for PC on June 26, 2009. A manga adaptation based on the game began serialization on March 26, 2009, in Comp Ace. A fandisc, Stellar Theater Encore, came out June 24, 2011. A version of the game for PlayStation Portable was released in February 2013 by Cyberfront; both a physical release, and a download release compatible with the PlayStation Vita. The PSP version removes sexual content but adds a new character and has a different opening animation.

Development
The character designs of Stellar Theater are done by Hiro Suzuhira.

References

External links
Official website (PC) 
Official website (PSP) 

2009 video games
Bishōjo games
Eroge
Japan-exclusive video games
Visual novels
Windows games
PlayStation Portable games
PlayStation Vita games
Seinen manga
Video games developed in Japan
CyberFront games